The 2020 Brickyard 400, branded as Big Machine Hand Sanitizer 400 Powered by Big Machine Records is a NASCAR Cup Series race that was held on July 5, 2020 at Indianapolis Motor Speedway in Speedway, Indiana. It is the 27th running of the Brickyard 400. Contested over 161 laps—extended from 160 laps due to an overtime finish, on the  speedway, it was the 16th race of the 2020 NASCAR Cup Series season.

This was the first NASCAR race without 4-time Brickyard 400 winner Jimmie Johnson since the 2001 New Hampshire 300, and the first Brickyard 400 since 2001 not to featuring him.

Report

Background

The Indianapolis Motor Speedway, located in Speedway, Indiana, (an enclave suburb of Indianapolis) in the United States, is the home of the Indianapolis 500 and the Brickyard 400.

Constructed in 1909, it is the original speedway, the first racing facility so named. It has a permanent seating capacity estimated at 235,000 with infield seating raising capacity to an approximate 400,000. It is the highest-capacity sports venue in the world.

Due to postponements stemming from the COVID-19 pandemic, the 2020 edition of the Brickyard 400 became part of a double-header weekend, as the IndyCar Series moved their GMR Grand Prix to July 4, the day before 400. However, all races during the weekend were run with no fans in attendance.

In the lead up to the race, multi-time winner Jimmie Johnson announced he had tested positive for COVID-19 and was forced to withdraw. Justin Allgaier replaced Johnson for the weekend.

Entry list
 (R) denotes rookie driver.
 (i) denotes driver who are ineligible for series driver points.

Allgaier replaced Jimmie Johnson after Johnson tested positive for COVID-19.

Qualifying
Joey Logano was awarded the pole for the race as determined by a random draw.

Starting Lineup

Race

Stage Results

Stage One
Laps: 50

Stage Two
Laps: 50

Final Stage Results

Stage Three
Laps: 60

Race statistics
 Lead changes: 11 among 9 different drivers
 Cautions/Laps: 9 for 43
 Red flags: 1 for 11 minutes and 17 seconds
 Time of race: 3 hours, 16 minutes and 5 seconds
 Average speed:

Media

Television
NBC Sports covered the race on the television side. Rick Allen, Jeff Burton, Steve Letarte and Dale Earnhardt Jr. covered the race from the booth at Charlotte Motor Speedway. Marty Snider and Kelli Stavast handled the pit road duties on site. Rutledge Wood handled the features from the track.

Radio
Indianapolis Motor Speedway Radio Network and the Performance Racing Network jointly co-produced the radio broadcast for the race, which was simulcast on Sirius XM NASCAR Radio, and aired on IMS or PRN stations, depending on contractual obligations. The lead announcers and two pit reporters were PRN staff, while the turns announcers and one pit reporter were from IMS.

Standings after the race

Drivers' Championship standings

Manufacturers' Championship standings

Note: Only the first 16 positions are included for the driver standings.
. – Driver has clinched a position in the NASCAR Cup Series playoffs.

References

2020 Brickyard 400
Brickyard 400
Brickyard 400
Brickyard 400